Alfred Robinson (born 1916, date of death unknown) was an English professional footballer who played as an inside forward in the Football League for York City, in non-League football for Washington Colliery and Scarborough, and was on the books of Bolton Wanderers without making a league appearance. He later worked as a coach at Rowntrees.

References

1916 births
Year of death missing
People from The Boldons
Footballers from Tyne and Wear
Footballers from County Durham
English footballers
Association football forwards
Washington Colliery F.C. players
Bolton Wanderers F.C. players
York City F.C. players
Scarborough F.C. players
English Football League players